Klisa is a village in Croatia. Klisa is administratively part of the City of Osijek where it is administered as one of suburbs. The Osijek Airport is located southwest of the village. Klisa belongs to the first category among the Areas of Special State Concern. The settlement was originally one of regional pustaras, a Pannonian type of hamlet.

Geography
Klisa is connected with the rest of country by the D2 road and the Osijek Airport. There are 4 streets in total in village and they bear the names Vukovarska, Radnička, Dalmatinska and Đura Jakšić Street. Until 1991 Klisa was administratively part of the Vukovar municipality. Historically, up to 1948, Klisa was statistically reported as a part of Bobota or Bijelo Brdo.

Demographic
At the time of 2011 Census of Croatia 83% of local population were Serbs, while ethnic Croats were 16% of local population. Klisa is facing very high level of population decline caused by high death rate, low birth rate and high emigration. Together with Tvrđavica, Klisa has the worst demographic indicators among the settlements of the City of Osijek. Population of Klisa is on average the oldest in the City of Osijek. If current trends remain in place, population projection for Klisa estimate that village will be extinct until 2050.

Politics
In 2018 local elections in Osijek Klisa was a polling place with the lowest turnout. Only 15 voters participated in elections constituting turnout of just below 6%. 14 out of 15 voters voted for the Democratic Alliance of Serbs which was the only party on the local ballot while one vote was irregular. The Independent Democratic Serb Party, dominant party among the Serbs of Croatia, did not participate in the elections while the Croatian Democratic Union was an absolute winner at the city level.

Education
Branch school of Elementary school Bobota is located in Klisa, 4 kilometers away from central school in Bobota. Education at the local school in Klisa is conducted in Serbian. The school building in Vera was built in 1924 and additional parts were completed in 1933. The school has only one classroom, hallway, toilets and a storage room. Building is in poor condition due to deterioration of the roof construction, carpentry, and especially electrical installations.

Culture
The day of Pentecost, as celebrated in accordance with the Eastern Orthodox Julian Calendar, is the public holiday of the Local Council of Klisa.

Since 2001 the City and University Library of Osijek is providing bookmobile services in Klisa. Vehicle was a gift from the Balkan Peace Project from Haarlem in the Netherlands while the City of Osijek is paying salaries for employees.

References

Populated places in Osijek-Baranja County
Serb communities in Croatia